Gröditz is a town in the district Meißen, in Saxony, Germany. The town is located 12 km northeast of Riesa, and 7 km southwest of Elsterwerda.

Geography 
Gröditz is located on a 100 meter high plains that of the Röder is crossed. The city is located on the Saxon side of today's Saxon - Brandenburg border and the former Saxon - Prussian border. By Groeditz leads the Elsterwerda-Grödel raft Channel (Floßgraben) that for the supply of the Dresden-Meissen Elbe Valley with wood from the Schrade forest was created and later to a location-promoting compound of iron-processing plants Riesa, Groeditz and Lauchhammer was (1947 shipping set).

Gröditz includes not only the core city's districts but also Nauwalde, Nieska, Reppis, Spansberg and Schweinfurth.

History 
The town was first mentioned in 1363, but was at least since the late 12th century and was inhabited Slavic (the Röderaue has been inhabited since the 1st century). Erected in 1748 Elsterwerda-Grödel raft Channel, by a Bomätscher (Treidler, ship puller) powered waterway, formed the basis for the later industrialization. Graf Detlev Carl von Einsiedel bought 1779 Groditzer mill and founded at this location Gröditzer ironworks (Lauchhammer plant), in 1825, the foundation stone for the construction of a blast furnace, which was taken 1827 in operation.

During the World War II, there was a forced labor camp in the  Lauchhammer works  of the Central German steel plants of the Flick Group, in which 4000 prisoners of war, women and men from the countries occupied by Germany forced labor had to do in the gun production. Moreover, there was from October 1944 to April 1945 an Outdoor stock of Flossenbürg with more than 1000  concentration camp prisoners, including 300 Jews. The extremely inhumane living conditions led to the deaths of many forced laborers.

On October 5, 1967 Groeditz received city rights.

On 25 May 2009 the city was the Federal Government conferred title of "place of diversity".

Incorporations 
On October 1, 1928, in the north of Groeditz neighboring village Reppis was incorporated. On 1 January 2013, the incorporation of the neighboring community Nauwalde, which had since 2000 a member of the Administrative Community Groeditz followed.

Population development 

Development of the population (2013):

Religions 
 Evangelical Lutheran Church
 Roman Catholicism
 Methodist Church
 New Apostolic Church
 Evangelical Free Church congregation
 Apostelamt Jesu Christi

Famous people 

 Siegfried Richter (1922–2000), entrepreneur, man of charity, honored with the Order of Merit of the Federal Republic of Germany and with the Order of Merit of Saxony
 Klaus Sammer (born 1942), former East Germany national football team player and trainer
 Dieter Riedel (born 1947), former East Germany national football team player and trainer
 Gottfried Sembdner, concert pianist

References 

Gröditz. Bilder erzählen; Gröditz 1993, 96 Seiten (115 Abb.) 
Gröditz, Stadtplan 1:7.500; Städteverlag Fellbach 1999, 
 Siegfried Richter Der Mutmacher. Ein Sachse kehrt heim; Gröditz (Selbstverlag) 1999;
Gröditz. Topographische Karte 1:25.000; Landesvermessungsamt Brandenburg 1994, 
Paul Namyslik: "Chronik der Röderstadt Gröditz"; Meißner Tageblatt Verlags GmbH 2005, 478 Seiten (329 Abb.), 
 Paul Namyslik: "Chronik der Röderstadt Gröditz 2005 bis 2010", 
 Infobroschüre der Stadt: „Gröditz - Sachsen“ (online als PDF-Datei; 5,8 MB)
 Egon Förster: Zwangsarbeiter in Gröditz 1939-1945. Gröditz 2004
 Mathias Antusch: Zwangsarbeit im Stahlwerk Gröditz. Institut für Geschichte der Universität der Bundeswehr München, Neubiberg 2004, 
 

Meissen (district)